is a Japanese former professional footballer who played as a forward. He played for Japan national team.

He is best known for playing the majority of his career at Kashima Antlers, in addition to his spells with Italian sides Sampdoria and Messina.

Yanagisawa earned 58 caps for the Japan national team, and represented them at two World Cups, the 2000 Olympics and the 2000 Asian Cup.

Club career
Yanagisawa was born in Imizu on May 27, 1977. After graduating from high school, he joined Kashima Antlers in 1996. He debuted in May 1996. In 1997, he became a regular player and was selected Rookie of the Year awards. In 1990s, the club won the champions at 1996, 1998 J1 League, 1997 J.League Cup and 1997 Emperor's Cup. In Asia, the club won 3rd place at 1998–99 Asian Cup Winners' Cup. In 2000, the club won all three major title in Japan; J1 League, J.League Cup and Emperor's Cup. In 2001, the club won J1 League for 2 years in a row and he was selected Japanese Footballer of the Year awards. In 2002, the club won J.League Cup.

In June 2003, Yanagisawa moved to Italian Serie A club Sampdoria. He moved to Messina in 2004.

In March 2006, Yanagisawa returned to Kashima Antlers. In 2007, the club won J1 League and Emperor's Cup. However his opportunity to play decreased behind young player Yuzo Tashiro and Shinzo Koroki. He moved to Kyoto Sanga FC in 2008. He scored 14 goals which is top score in Japanese player in the league. However he could not scored many goals from 2009. He moved to Vegalta Sendai in 2011. In March 2011, 2011 Tōhoku earthquake and tsunami occurred in wide area including Sendai. Although he did not play many matches, the club won the 4th place in 2011 and 2nd place in 2012. He retired end of 2014 season.

International career
In June 1997, Yanagisawa was selected Japan U20 national team for 1997 World Youth Championship. At this competition, he wore the number 10 shirt for Japan and played all five matches and scored four goals.

On February 15, 1998, Yanagisawa debuted for Japan national team against Australia. From 1999, he was selected Japan well by manager Philippe Troussier.

In September 2000, he also was selected Japan U23 national team for 2000 Summer Olympics. He played in all four matches and scored a goal against United States in Quarterfinal.

In October, he also played at 2000 AFC Asian Cup and Japan won the champions. In 2002, he was selected Japan for 2002 FIFA World Cup. He played as forward with club teammate Takayuki Suzuki in three games. He also played at 2005 FIFA Confederations Cup and 2006 FIFA World Cup. He played 58 games and scored 17 goals for Japan until 2006.

Career statistics

Club

International

Scores and results list Japan's goal tally first, score column indicates score after each Yanagisawa goal.

Honors
Kashima Antlers
 J1 League: 1996, 1998, 2000, 2001

Japan
 AFC Asian Cup: 2000

Individual
 Asian Player of the Month: January 1998
 J.League Rookie of the Year: 1997
 J.League Best XI: 1998, 2001, 2008
 Japanese Footballer of the Year: 2001

References

External links

 

 
 
 Japan National Football Team Database

1977 births
Living people
Association football people from Toyama Prefecture
Japanese footballers
Association football forwards
Japan youth international footballers
Japan international footballers
J1 League players
Serie A players
Kashima Antlers players
U.C. Sampdoria players
A.C.R. Messina players
Kyoto Sanga FC players
Vegalta Sendai players
Olympic footballers of Japan
Footballers at the 2000 Summer Olympics
2000 AFC Asian Cup players
2002 FIFA World Cup players
2005 FIFA Confederations Cup players
2006 FIFA World Cup players
AFC Asian Cup-winning players
Expatriate footballers in Italy
Japanese expatriate sportspeople in Italy
Japanese expatriate footballers